The 2150 class was a class of diesel locomotives built by Clyde Engineering, Eagle Farm for Queensland Railways in 1978–1979.

History
The 2150 class were an evolution of the 2130 class. They differed by having a modular control system and the sandboxes relocated from the nose to the bogies. All were transferred to QR National in 2004, which became Aurizon in 2012.

In 2011, four were sold to TasRail entering service as the 2050 class. In August 2013, seven were exported to South Africa. Three were sold by Aurizon back to Queensland Rail in 2014.

References

Aurizon diesel locomotives
Clyde Engineering locomotives
Co-Co locomotives
Diesel locomotives of Queensland
Diesel locomotives of Tasmania
Queensland Rail locomotives
Railway locomotives introduced in 1978
3 ft 6 in gauge locomotives of Australia
Diesel-electric locomotives of Australia